Saint Diego or Saint Didacus may refer to:

Didacus of Alcalá (d. 1463), missionary to the Canary Islands
Juan Diego (d. 1548), first Native American Catholic saint